Ronald William Atchison (April 21, 1930 – June 23, 2010) was a Canadian football defensive lineman who played for the Saskatchewan Roughriders from 1952 through 1968. He was part of the Grey Cup championship-winning Saskatchewan Roughriders in 1966.  Atchison was inducted into the Canadian Football Hall of Fame in 1978. He was inducted into the Saskatchewan Sports Hall of Fame in 1980.

Born in Central Butte and raised in Saskatoon, Atchison played for the Saskatoon Hilltops from 1947 to 1949. In 1976, in recognition, the Hilltops named their practice field and permanent quarters after him. 

During Atchison's time as a member of the Saskatchewan Roughriders, he was named to the CFL's Western All-Star team 6 times as a defensive tackle.

References
Ron Atchison at the Canadian Football Hall of Fame

1930 births
2010 deaths
Canadian football defensive linemen
Canadian Football Hall of Fame inductees
Players of Canadian football from Saskatchewan
Saskatchewan Roughriders players